The Canton of Rennes-Nord-Ouest is a former canton of France, in the Ille-et-Vilaine département. It had 33,126 inhabitants (2012). It was disbanded following the French canton reorganisation which came into effect in March 2015.

The canton comprised the following communes:
 Rennes (partly);
 Gévezé;
 Pacé; and
 Parthenay-de-Bretagne.

References

Former cantons of Ille-et-Vilaine
Canton Rennes Nord Ouest
2015 disestablishments in France
States and territories disestablished in 2015